Nazemabad may refer to:
 Nazemabad, East Azerbaijan
 Nazemabad, Kurdistan

See also
Nizamabad (disambiguation)